Down Home is the second studio album by pop-folk duo Seals and Crofts, released in 1970.

Track listing
All songs written by Jim Seals and Dash Crofts unless otherwise noted.

Side one
"Ridin' Thumb" - 3:50
"Hand-Me-Down Shoe" - 3:28
"Purple Hand" - 2:36
"Robin" - 1:55
"Hollow Reed" - 3:31

Side two
"Gabriel Go On Home" - 3:54
"Tin Town" - 3:13
"Today" - 3:39
"Cotton Mouth" - 3:42
"Granny Will Your Dog Bite?" (Traditional, arranged by Seals) - 0:40
"Leave" (Seals, John Trombatore) - 4:55
"See My Life (Reprise)" [secret track] (Seals) - 0:25

Charts

Personnel 

 Jimmy Seals – vocals, acoustic guitar, violin
 Dash Crofts – vocals, mandolin
 John Hall – electric guitar
 John Simon – piano
 Paul Harris – organ
 Eddie Rich – bass A1, B2, B6
 Harvey Brooks – bass A3, A5, B1, B4
 Jim Rolleston – bass A2, A4, B3, B5
 Greg Thomas – drums
 Producer: John Simon
 Engineers: Mark Harman, Steve Barncard, Tony May
 Album design: Wayne Kimbell
 Cover photograph: Richard Edlund
 Liner photograph: Hillary Herbst

References

Seals and Crofts albums
1970 albums
Albums produced by John Simon (record producer)